Lobariella is a genus of lichens belonging to the family Peltigeraceae.

The species of this genus are found in America.

Species
Lobariella angustata 
Lobariella auriculata 
Lobariella botryoides 
Lobariella corallophora 
Lobariella crenulata 
Lobariella ecorticata 
Lobariella exornata 
Lobariella flavomedullosa 
Lobariella flynniana  – Hawaii
Lobariella isidiata 
Lobariella nashii 
Lobariella olivascens 
Lobariella pallida 
Lobariella pallidocrenulata 
Lobariella papillifera 
Lobariella parmelioides 
Lobariella peltata 
Lobariella pseudocrenulata 
Lobariella reticulata 
Lobariella robusta  – Hawaii
Lobariella rugulosa 
Lobariella sandwicensis  – Hawaii
Lobariella sipmanii  – Colombia
Lobariella soredians 
Lobariella spathulifera 
Lobariella stenroosiae 
Lobariella subcorallophora 
Lobariella subcrenulata 
Lobariella subexornata

References

Peltigerales
Peltigerales genera
Lichen genera
Taxa described in 2002